An inkjet printable DVD is a DVD made with an inkjet ink permeable coating on the upper, non-recording surface of the DVD which allow consumers to perform printings onto them directly by using a special CD/DVD inkjet printer. Inkjet printable DVD media offer a way to customize DVD-Rs. When inserted into a suitable inkjet printer, it will be capable of reproducing appropriate inkjet printer page output, including text and pictures.

Printing directly onto an inkjet printable DVD-R provides the following advantages over traditional labels:

Lower Cost: 
Generally, it is more affordable to buy printable inkjet media than to buy both media and labels. While the printer might represent an additional expense, a printer is needed to print labels anyway and a media-capable printer costs about the same as an inkjet printer.

User-friendly: 
It is easier than placing labels on many discs, as most printers have easy-to-use disc alignment.

Safer: 
Labels can peel and cause damages to drives and player mechanisms.  However, as the inkjet DVD surface is part of the media, drive damage is less likely, regardless of storage conditions. Inkjet DVD media are also safer in slot-loaded optical drives.

These DVDs were typically slightly higher priced than their standard counterparts but nowadays the prices are comparable.

External links 
 Understanding Recordable & Rewritable DVD - Disc Labeling
 OSTA CD-R and CD-RW Technologies
 

DVD